Lars Jakobson (1959, Lund) is a Swedish author. Among the awards he won are the Svenska Dagbladet book prize and the Selma Lagerlöf Prize, both in 2006. For many years he lived in  Stockholm.

Bibliography
Vinterkvarteret (novel, 1985)
Vetten (novel, 1986)
Menageri (short stories, 1989)
Pumpan (novel, 1991)
Hemsökelser (short stories, 1994)
Kanalbyggarnas barn (novel, 1997)
I den Röda damens slott. En martiansk biografi (novel, 2000)
Stjärnfall. Om sf (essays, 2003)  (Co-written with Ola Larsmo and Steve Sem-Sandberg)
Berättelser om djur och andra (short stories, 2004)
Vid den stora floden (novel, 2006)
Vännerna (novel, 2010)
Effekter (essays and short stories, 2011)

References

External links
Lars Jakobson

1959 births
Swedish male writers
Selma Lagerlöf Prize winners
Living people
Dobloug Prize winners